The Doctor Trap is a BBC Books original novel written by Simon Messingham and based on the long-running science fiction television series Doctor Who. It features the Tenth Doctor and Donna Noble. It was published on 4 September 2008 alongside Ghosts of India and Shining Darkness.

Summary
Sebastiene was perhaps once human. He might look like a 19th-century nobleman but in truth he is a ruthless hunter. He likes nothing more than luring difficult opposition to a planet then hunting them down for sport. And now he's caught them all - from Zargregs to Moogs, and even the odd Eternal…

In fact, Sebastiene is after only one more prize. For this trophy, he knows he is going to need help. He's brought together the finest hunters in the universe to play the most dangerous game for the deadliest quarry of them all. They are hunting for the last of the Time Lords - the Tenth Doctor.

Audiobook
An abridged audiobook was released as a double CD by BBC Audio on the same day as the novel. It was read by actor Russell Tovey, who played Midshipman Alonso Frame in the television stories "Voyage of the Damned", and "The End of Time".  The audio was poorly received, critically.

References

External links

The Cloister Library - The Doctor Trap

2008 British novels
2008 science fiction novels
New Series Adventures
Tenth Doctor novels
Novels by Simon Messingham